Prince Adolphus, Duke of Cambridge,  (Adolphus Frederick; 24 February 1774 – 8 July 1850) was the tenth child and seventh son of King George III and Queen Charlotte of the United Kingdom.  He held the title of Duke of Cambridge from 1801 until his death. He also served as Viceroy of Hanover on behalf of his brothers George IV and William IV.

Prince Adolphus married Princess Augusta of Hesse-Kassel in 1818, and they had three children: George, Augusta and Mary Adelaide.

Early life

Prince Adolphus was born in February 1774 at Buckingham House, then known as the "Queen's House", in the City and Liberty of Westminster, now within Greater London. He was the youngest son of King George III and Queen Charlotte to survive childhood.

Adolphus was baptized on 24 March 1774 in the Great Council Chamber at St James's Palace by Frederick Cornwallis, Archbishop of Canterbury. His godparents were Prince John Adolphus of Saxe-Gotha-Altenburg (his great-uncle, for whom the Earl of Hertford, Lord Chamberlain, stood proxy), Landgrave Charles of Hesse-Kassel (his first cousin once removed, for whom the Earl of Jersey, Extra Lord of the Bedchamber, stood proxy) and Princess Wilhelmina of Orange (the wife of his first cousin once removed, for whom Elizabeth Howard, Dowager Countess of Effingham, former Lady of the Bedchamber to Queen Charlotte, stood proxy).

Adolphus was tutored at home until summer 1786, when he was sent to the University of Göttingen in Germany, along with his brothers Prince Ernest (created Duke of Cumberland in 1799) and Prince Augustus (created Duke of Sussex in 1801).

Military career
Adolphus was made honorary Colonel-in-Chief of the Hanoverian Guard Foot Regiment 1789–1803, but his military training began in 1791, when he and Prince Ernest went to Hanover to study under the supervision of the Hanoverian commander Field Marshal Wilhelm von Freytag. He remained on Freytag's staff during the Flanders Campaign in 1793. His first taste of action was at Famars on 23 May. He was wounded and captured at the Battle of Hondschoote 6 September, but was quickly rescued. As a Hanoverian General-Major, he commanded a Hessian brigade under his paternal great-uncle, General Johann Ludwig von Wallmoden-Gimborn in Autumn 1794, then commanded the Hanoverian Guards during the retreat through Holland. Remaining in Germany, he commanded a brigade of the Corps of Observation from 22 October 1796 until 12 January 1798. He was made a British Army colonel in 1794, and lieutenant general on 24 August 1798. In 1800 – whilst stationed in the Electorate of Hanover – he attended the founding of a village (part of the settlement of the moorlands north of Bremen), which was named after him: Adolphsdorf (since 1974 a component locality of Grasberg).

During the War of the Second Coalition against France (1799–1802), Adolphus traveled to Berlin in 1801, in order to prevent the impending Prussian occupation of the Electorate. France demanded it, as it was stipulated in the Peace of Basel (1795), obliging Prussia to ensure the Holy Roman Empire's neutrality in all the latter's territories north of the demarcation line at the river Main, including Hanover. Regular Hanoverian troops, therefore, had been commandeered to join the multilateral so-called "Demarcation Army". His efforts were in vain. In 1803, he was senior army commander, and replaced Wallmoden as commander on the Weser on 1 June. With the advance of French forces on one side and 24,000 Prussian soldiers on the other, the situation was hopeless. Cambridge refused to become involved in discussions of capitulation, handed over his command to Hammerstein (Ompteda claims he was forced to resign), and withdrew to England. A plan to recruit additional soldiers in Hanover to be commanded by the Prince had also failed.

In 1803, Adolphus was appointed as commander-in-chief of the newly founded King's German Legion, and in 1813, he became field marshal. George III appointed Prince Adolphus a Knight of the Garter on 2 June 1776, and created him Duke of Cambridge, Earl of Tipperary, and Baron Culloden on 24 November 1801.

The Duke served as colonel-in-chief of the Coldstream Regiment of Foot Guards (Coldstream Guards after 1855) from September 1805, and as colonel-in-chief of the 60th (The Duke of York's Own Rifle Corps) Regiment of Foot from January 1824. After the collapse of Napoleon's empire, he was Military Governor of Hanover from 4 November 1813 – 24 October 1816, then Governor General of Hanover from 24 October 1816 – 20 June 1837 (viceroy from 22 February 1831). He was made Field Marshal 26 November 1813. While he was Viceroy, the Duke became patron of the Cambridge-Dragoner ("Cambridge Dragoons") Regiment of the 
Hanoverian army. This regiment was stationed in Celle, and their barracks, the Cambridge-Dragoner Kaserne, were used by the Bundeswehr until 1995. The "March of the Hannoversches Cambridge-Dragoner-Regiment" is part of the Bundeswehr's traditional music repertoire.

Marriage
After the death of Princess Charlotte in 1817, the Duke was set the task of finding a bride for his eldest unmarried brother, the Duke of Clarence (later William IV), in the hope of securing heirs to the throne—Charlotte had been the only legitimate grandchild of George III, despite the fact that the King had twelve surviving children.  After several false starts, the Duke of Clarence settled on Princess Adelaide of Saxe-Meiningen.  The way was cleared for the Duke of Cambridge to find a bride for himself.

The Duke of Cambridge was married first at Kassel, Hesse on 7 May and then at Buckingham Palace on 1 June 1818 to his second cousin Augusta (25 July 1797 – 6 April 1889), the third daughter of Prince Frederick of Hesse.

Viceroy
From 1816 to 1837, the Duke of Cambridge served as viceroy of the Kingdom of Hanover on behalf of his elder brothers, George IV and later William IV. When his niece succeeded to the British throne on 20 June 1837 as Queen Victoria, the 122-year union of the crowns of the United Kingdom and Hanover ended, due to Hanover being under Salic Law. Ernest Augustus became King of Hanover and the Duke of Cambridge returned to Britain.

Death
The Duke of Cambridge died on 8 July 1850 at Cambridge House, Piccadilly, London, and was buried at St Anne's Church, Kew. His remains were removed to St George's Chapel, Windsor Castle in 1930. His only son, Prince George, succeeded to his peerages.

Titles, styles, honours and arms

Titles and styles
24 February 1774 – 24 November 1801: His Royal Highness The Prince Adolphus
24 November 1801 – 8 July 1850: His Royal Highness The Duke of Cambridge

Honours
KG: Knight of the Garter, 2 June 1786
GCB: Knight Grand Cross of the Bath (military), 2 January 1815
GCMG: Grand Master of St Michael and St George, 20 June 1825; Principal Knight Grand Cross, 16 August 1832
PC: Privy Counsellor, 1802
GCH: Knight Grand Cross of the Royal Guelphic Order, 12 August 1815

Foreign
Knight of the Black Eagle, 21 September 1823 (Prussia)
Knight of St. Andrew, 1844 (Russia)
Knight Grand Cross of the Golden Lion, 6 May 1818 (Hesse-Kassel)

Arms
The Duke's arms were the Royal Arms of the House of Hanover, with a three-point label of difference. The first and third points containing two hearts, and the centre point bearing a red cross. His arms were adopted by his younger daughter, Princess Mary Adelaide, and her heirs included them in their arms quartered with the arms of the Duke of Teck.

Issue
The Duke and Duchess of Cambridge had three children:

Ancestors

Family tree

See also
British Royal Family
House of Hanover
Duke of Cambridge
Cambridge Bay, Nunavut
Adolphustown, Ontario, Canada.

Further reading

External links

References

1774 births
1850 deaths
18th-century British people
19th-century British people
19th-century viceregal rulers
Princes of Great Britain
Princes of the United Kingdom
Hanoverian princes
House of Hanover
British field marshals
Dukes of Cambridge
 Adolphus
People from Westminster
Knights Grand Cross of the Order of the Bath
Knights Grand Cross of the Order of St Michael and St George
Knights of the Garter
Chancellors of the University of St Andrews
King's German Legion
British Army personnel of the French Revolutionary Wars
British Army commanders of the Napoleonic Wars
Burials at St George's Chapel, Windsor Castle
Barons Culloden
British princes
Children of George III of the United Kingdom
Royal reburials
Sons of kings